Kelly Hetherington (born 10 March 1989) is an Australian middle-distance runner who competed in the 800 metres at the 2013 IAAF World Championships in Moscow.

She has a long string of games under her belt - winning the 2013 Australian 800m championships and taking silver in the 2011 Australian Championships.

She has made the Australian team for the 2013 World Athletics Championship (800m),  2014 Commonwealth Games (800m),  2015 World Relay Championships (4x800m - Bronze medal) and the 2011 World Uni championships (800m).

External links
Kelly Hetherington official website

1989 births
Living people
Australian female middle-distance runners
World Athletics Championships athletes for Australia